Ejovi Nuwere (born  1980 is an American security engineer and entrepreneur. He was the co-founder of Google funded wireless company Fon and Microsoft funded analytics company Ivy Softworks.

Early life 
Nuwere's early life is documented in his autobiography, Hacker cracker: a journey from the mean streets of Brooklyn to the frontiers of cyberspace, written with David Chanoff. Despite the title, it is not focused solely on hacking. Nuwere writes about his mother's battle with drug addiction and her death and his families episodes of homelessness. The book was published by W. Morro in 2002. He is included in the standard reference work Contemporary Authors.

Before he finished high school, he had established a life in the security research community as a member of w00w00 and an increasingly prominent career as a computer security consultant. At the age of twenty he was a security specialist for one of the world's largest financial houses.

Career 

Nuwere has founded a number of companies in the media and security space.

SecurityLab Technologies
Nuwere founded the VOIP security company SecurityLab and was selected by Business Week as one of the top young entrepreneurs under 25.

Kaori-san
Kaori-san is Japan's first virtual assistant service. The company launched in July 2013 as a spinout from Land Rush Group.

Re:mark
Re:mark is a joint venture with Japan's 4th largest newspaper publisher Sankei. Re:mark is a commenting system similar to Disqus and serves as 40M unique users across Japan per month. Acquired in 2013.

Fon 
Nuwere was the North American founder of the wireless company Fon, at one time the largest WiFi network in the world. He launched the company in the USA and organized a A-list of digerati to join the company as advisors.

The Infrastructure of Democracy
In 2005 Nuwere gathered in Spain with a group of internet luminaries and security specialist that included Joi Ito, Jeff Moss, Chris Goggans and Dan Gillmore at the Madrid Summit to address the issue of terrorism and the internet. The result of the invite only conference attended by Kofi Annan and several prime ministers was document shared among the worlds politicians that addressed how to best fight terrorism while protecting the freedoms associated with the web.

Columbia Music Entertainment 
Nuwere led Columbia Music Entertainment's R&D division working with CEO Sadahiko Hirose CTO Jordan Ritter, a childhood friend from his early computer security days. The team began building a Japanese-based, competition-oriented promotional platform for new artists called Otorevo. Despite the measurable successes of Otorevo, the company's Board of Directors voted to terminate all R&D projects in March 2008.

Sankei Shimbun
Nuwere has been a technology columnist for Sankei Shimbun, one of Japan's largest newspaper publishers since 2011.

Juki Net
Nuwere was hired as a security researcher by the Governor of Nagano to audit Japan's National ID system Basic Resident Registers Network. The audit uncovered a number of serious security flaws with national repercussions. When he attempted to discuss the security audit in public with permission of the Governor of Nagano the national government prevented the presentation. Nuwere sued the national government for violation of free speech, the first foreigner to ever do so in Japan.

References 

Living people
American computer businesspeople
1980 births